Fanfan is a 1993 French romantic comedy film directed by Alexandre Jardin based on his 1990 novel.

Fanfan or Fan Fan may also refer to:

People
 Fan Fan (rally driver); see 2013 Asia-Pacific Rally Championship
 FanFan (born 1976), Taiwanese entertainer
 Mose Se Sengo, a.k.a. "Fan Fan", Congolese musician
 José-Karl Pierre-Fanfan (born 1975), French association footballer
 Ducan Fanfan, see United States v. Booker
 Fan-Fan, pen name of Frances Irene Burge Griswold (1826–1900)

Other uses
 Fanfan (novel), 1990 French novel by Alexandre Jardin
 Fan Fan (1918 film), 1918 American comedy-drama film with Virginia Lee Corbin

See also
 Fan (disambiguation)
 Fanfan la Tulipe (disambiguation)